Frontiers was Southern California's oldest and largest lesbian, gay, bisexual, transgender (LGBT) magazine. Founded in 1981, it was distributed freely at gay bars, clubs and businesses throughout Southern California. The biweekly publication focused on local, national and international news related to the LGBT community, entertainment, as well as coverage of HIV/AIDS-related topics and other important issues, in addition to its popular escort listings section, Frontiers4Men. As of February 2014, it had a staff of 19 and claimed a readership of 270,000.

The publication documented and reported on news events including coming out stories of proximally close celebrities and is archived in many LGBT collections including National Transgender Library collection.

The paper was purchased in 2007 by Mark Hundahl and David Stern. Hundahl died in December 2012. The publication filed for Chapter 11 bankruptcy protection in March 2013.  At the time it reported circulation of 30,000 copies on a semi-monthly basis. In February 2014, businessman Michael Turner bought the paper and announced plans to expand its readership base, and to make efforts to attract larger local and national advertisers in lieu of the classified ads and advertising focused on escort services and similar sexual content. The magazine began to be published on a weekly basis.

On September 23, 2016, Frontier's parent, Multimedia Platforms Worldwide, suspended operations due to financial difficulties, effectively shutting Frontiers down.

References

External links
 

LGBT-related magazines published in the United States
Lifestyle magazines published in the United States
News magazines published in the United States
Weekly magazines published in the United States
Biweekly magazines published in the United States
Defunct magazines published in the United States
Feminist magazines
Free magazines
Magazines established in 1981
Magazines disestablished in 2016
Magazines published in California
1981 establishments in California
2016 disestablishments in California